Komitas I Aghtsetsi or Komitas I of Aghdznik was a Catholicos of Armenia and Supreme Patriarch as well as the bishop of Taron from 615 until his death in 628. He is known also as Komitas Shinogh, "The Builder" — an allusion to his significant patronage of building and restoration work  He was instrumental in the realization of several architectural projects, among which were the complete renovation of the Cathedral at the Holy See of Etchmiadzin; the construction of the Church of St. Hripsime, which stands to this day on the site of an earlier edifice; and the building of the Church of St. Gregory in Dvin.  

Komitas was also the editor of the collection of Armenian translations of patristic texts (including extracts from lost texts, e.g. Timothy Aelurus) known as the Seal of the Faith.

A devout Catholic, he was never far away from disputes regarding the faith. He was a vociferous participant in doctrinal disputes. He sided with the orthodox school of thought of the Armenian Church during the Council of Ctesiphon (615–616). The Council concluded with the acceptance of Monophysitism; the Chalcedonian and Nestorian doctrines were renounced.

A poet and musician, Komitas I contributed to the hymnography of the Armenian Church. His sharakan "Andzink Nviryalk", ('Devoted Souls') earned him a special place in the Armenian Church hymn-book or Sharaknots. This hymn, noted for its poetic and lyric beauty, was composed to commemorate the completion of the rebuilding of the Church of St Hripsime. It is claimed to be the first Armenian hymn in praise of a post-biblical saint, based on the account of St Hripsime and her companions related in the History of Armenia composed by the fifth-century father of Armenian historiography, Agathangelos.

References

 Catholicos Komitas, Le sceau de la foi, Etchmiazin, 1914 (reimpression, Lisbon, 1974).

Year of birth missing
628 deaths
7th-century Armenian poets
Armenian musicians
Catholicoi of Armenia
Christian hymnwriters
7th-century Oriental Orthodox archbishops
Armenian male poets
Armenian hymnwriters